Miranda was launched in Liverpool in 1829 as a West Indiaman. She was condemned at Calcutta in 1840.

Career
Miranda first appeared in Lloyd's Register (LR) in 1829.

By 1839 Mirandas homeport was Greenock, and she was trading with Calcutta.

When , McCloud, master, was wrecked on 7 February 1840 on Point Palmyras Reef, Miranda rescued the survivors.

Fate
Miranda, Thompson, master, arrived at Calcutta from the Clyde on 14 February. On 19 March she sailed for London but on 11 April she put back into Calcutta, leaky. 

Miranda, Thompson, master, was condemned at Calcutta in 1840 after again having put back on 11 August. Her hull was sold for Rupees 5,000.

Citations

 
Age of Sail merchant ships of England
1829 ships
Maritime incidents in February 1840